Darkest Days is the third album released by industrial rock band Stabbing Westward on Columbia Records. The album was recorded in L.A. in 1997 and released on April 7, 1998. Although the album didn't achieve the same level of success as Wither Blister Burn & Peel, it received positive reviews and is often considered the band's best album. The band was dropped from Columbia Records in 2000 following this release. The track "Save Yourself" reached number 4 on the U.S. Mainstream Rock chart (the band's highest-placing single on that chart) and number 20 on the U.S. Modern Rock chart and remains a staple of alternative music. Darkest Days was certified gold on March 1, 2000.

Darkest Days is a concept album consisting of four acts, with each portraying a different emotional phase gone through after a break-up. The first act (tracks 1-4) is about sabotaging the relationship. The second act (tracks 5-9) is about lust, hope, and longing. The third act (tracks 10-12) is about hitting rock bottom after it is all over. The fourth act (tracks 13-16) is about recovery and self-respect.

Track listing

Appearances 
"The Thing I Hate" was featured in the commercial and introduction sequence of the 1998 PlayStation video game Duke Nukem: Time to Kill. It was later included on the Duke Nukem: Music to Score By soundtrack in 1999. Noah Antwiler of The Spoony Experiment used the song as his outro piece for the final segment of his review of the 1999 PC game Ultima IX: Ascension in 2013.
"Haunting Me" appeared in the 1998 science fiction horror film The Faculty.
"Save Yourself" was featured in the trailer of the 1999 film The Mod Squad and the trailer of the 2006 film The Covenant, along with an appearance on the soundtracks to Tekken: The Motion Picture, Urban Legend and in the 2008 video game Shaun White Snowboarding. In the HBO series True Blood, "Save Yourself" played during the end credits to the season 5 finale of the same name in 2012.
A remix of "Waking Up Beside You" was used in the 2000 film The Crow: Salvation and was also included on the film's soundtrack release.

Personnel 
Stabbing Westward
Christopher Hall – lead vocals, guitar
Marcus Eliopulos – guitar, backing vocals
Walter Flakus – keyboards, backing vocals
Jim Sellers – bass
Andrew Kubiszewski – drums, keyboards, guitar
Dave Jerden – producer
Ulrich Wild – producer, engineer
Bryan Carlstrom – engineer
Annette Cisneros – assistant engineer
Steve Mixdorf – assistant engineer
Steve Durkee – assistant engineer
Milton Chan – assistant engineer
Tom Baker – mastering
Dave McKean – cover design and illustrations
Dean Karr – band photography

Charts

References 

1998 albums
Albums produced by Dave Jerden
Albums produced by Ulrich Wild
Albums with cover art by Dave McKean
Columbia Records albums
Concept albums
Stabbing Westward albums